Shock Waves is a Swiss television drama anthology series, broadcast by Radio Télévision Suisse in 2018. The series consisted of four television films dramatizing true crime stories from European history.

The episodes premiered theatrically at the Solothurn Film Festival in February 2018, and two episodes of the series, Diary of My Mind and First Name: Mathieu, received theatrical screenings in the Panorama section at the 68th Berlin International Film Festival, prior to their television premieres in July. All four episodes were later screened at the 2018 Vancouver International Film Festival.

Episodes

References

External links

2018 Swiss television series debuts
Swiss crime television series
Swiss drama television series
2010s anthology television series